Sabrina Meister-Fesseler (born 1 September 1966) is a Swiss orienteering competitor. At the World Orienteering Championships in Grimstad in 1997 she placed 7th in the classic distance, 14th in the short distance, and won a bronze medal with the Swiss relay team. She placed fifth with the Swiss relay team at the World Orienteering Championships in Inverness in 1999.

References

External links
 
 Sabrina Meister-Fesseler at World of O Runners

1966 births
Living people
Swiss orienteers
Female orienteers
Foot orienteers
World Orienteering Championships medalists